Arcadia Valley is a rural locality in the Central Highlands Region, Queensland, Australia.

Geography
Arcadia Valley has the following mountains:

 Calf
 Castle Hill 
 Castle Rock
 Cow and 
 Mount Wadja 
 Pyramid Hill 
 Sphinx

History
It is believed that squatters in the 1850s named the area Arcadia meaning quiet rural simplicity.

Arcadia Valley State School opened on 3 March 1975.

Arcadia Valley was within the Shire of Bauhinia until 2008, when that shire was amalgamated into the Central Highlands Region.

Economy
The tradition mainstay of the local economy is beef production with cattle farms being the predominant land use. However, from 2013 Santos have been purchasing land and planning infrastructure for liquid natural gas extraction in the area with a pipeline to Gladstone.

There are a number of homesteads in the locality:

 Alambee
 Arcadia
 Austral Park
 Basalt Creek
 Bila Belong
 Bundaleer
 Bylot Plains
 Castle Hill
 Clematis
 Comet Side
 Glenidal
 Harding Dale
 Harrow
 Hilly Vale
 Kiamanna
 Leeora Downs
 Linga Longa
 Marjundale
 Mount Kingsley
 Purbrook
 Red Rock
 Sunnyholt
 Tarcoola
 Tarewinnabar
 Towrie
 Wangalee
 Warremba

Education
Arcadia Valley State School is a government primary (Prep-6) school for boys and girls at 4831 Arcadia Valley Road. In 2013, the school had five students and two teachers (one full-time equivalent). In 2018, the school had an enrolment of nine students with one teacher and four non-teaching staff (one full-time equivalent). The children come from local farms. The school does not have access to reticulated water and must depend on tanks filled by rainwater.

There are no nearby secondary schools. The options are distance education and boarding schools.

Amenities 
There is a Uniting Church congregation in Arcadia Valley. Services are held at local homesteads.

Attractions
Lake Nuga Nuga is within the locality. Part of the Nuga Nuga National Park, it is the largest natural lake in the Central Queensland sandstone belt and is popular for bird-watching (over 150 kinds of birds), fishing and canoeing.

References

Further reading
 

Central Highlands Region
Localities in Queensland